Fallen Angels is a comedy by the English playwright Noël Coward. It opened at the Globe Theatre, London (now called the Gielgud Theatre) on 21 April 1925 and ran until 29 August. The central theme of two wives admitting to premarital sex and contemplating adultery met hostility from the office of the official theatre censor, the Lord Chamberlain, and the necessary licence was granted only after the personal intervention of the Chamberlain.

Background
In 1924 Coward achieved his first hit as a playwright with The Vortex, and consolidated his success in March 1925 with the revue On with the Dance. His comedy Fallen Angels had already attracted the interest of Gladys Cooper, who wanted to produce the piece and co-star with Madge Titheradge, but the contractual commitments of the two actresses precluded it. It was not until the success of The Vortex that other managements became eager to stage the playwright's existing works, which, as well as Fallen Angels, included Hay Fever and Easy Virtue.

Fallen Angels was taken up by Marie Lohr and her husband Anthony Prinsep, who were jointly in management at the Globe Theatre in Shaftesbury Avenue. They intended it as a vehicle for Margaret Bannerman, a popular West End star. There was initially some difficulty in obtaining a licence from the theatre censor, the Lord Chamberlain, whose approval was required for any public theatrical presentation. An official in the Lord Chamberlain's office recommended that a licence should be refused on the grounds that the loose morals of the two main female characters "would cause too great a scandal". The Lord Chamberlain (Lord Cromer) overruled his subordinate: "I take the view that the whole thing is so much unreal farcical comedy, that subject to a few modifications in the dialogue it can pass."

Four days before the first night Bannerman was taken ill, and Tallulah Bankhead was brought in as a last-minute substitute. The play, directed by Stanley Bell, opened at the Globe on 21 April 1925 and ran for 158 performances, until 29 August.

Original cast
 Julia Sterroll – Tallulah Bankhead
 Frederick Sterroll – Arthur Wellesley
 Jane Banbury – Edna Best
 William Banbury – Gerald Ames
 Saunders – Mona Harrison
 Maurice Duclos – Austin Trevor
Source: The Times, 22 April 1925.

Synopsis
The play is set in the London flat of Frederick and Julia Sterroll in 1925.
Act 1
Two youngish men, Frederick Sterroll and William Banbury, go off on a golfing trip, leaving their wives to amuse themselves as best they can. The wives have each received a postcard from Maurice Duclos, whose lovers they had both been before their marriages. He tells them he is due in London and hopes to call on them imminently. Unsure whether they will be able to resist Maurice's powerful charm, they decide to leave before he arrives, but as they are about to go, suitcases in hand, the doorbell rings.

Act 2
The ring at the door had not been Maurice (it was the plumber), and the two women have decided to brave the forthcoming encounter. While waiting, quite nervously, for Maurice's arrival, they drink too many cocktails and too much champagne. Their old rivalry for Maurice's affections surfaces, they begin to bicker, and a tremendous quarrel ensues. By the end of the act Maurice has still not appeared and Julia has ordered Jane out of the flat.

Act 3
The next morning Julia wrongly imagines Jane has gone off with Maurice. In fury Julia tells William about his wife's supposed liaison. Jane, meanwhile, having spent the night innocently alone at a hotel, concludes that Julia and Maurice have gone off together, and she tells Frederick about her suspicions. Maurice finally arrives, and (almost) reassures the husbands that nobody has gone off with anybody, and there is nothing to worry about. He has taken the flat above the Sterrolls, and invites both couples to come and see it. The men decline, and Maurice escorts Julia and Jane to his flat. Presently the voices of all three are heard singing a sentimental love song; the husbands exchange panicked glances and rush upstairs.

Later productions
A production by the Amsterdam Municipal Theatre was banned after a  few performances in 1926. The play was presented on Broadway in 1927, with the following cast:
 Julia Sterroll – Fay Bainter
 Frederick Sterroll – Gordon Ash
 Jane Banbury – Estelle Winwood
 William Banbury – Gerald Hamer
 Saunders – Eileen Beldon
 Maurice Duclos – Luis Alberni

Under the title Le Printemps de Saint-Martin, the play was given in Paris in 1928 and again in 1945. Fallen Angels was revived in London in 1949, with Hermione Gingold and Hermione Baddeley as the wives. In a Broadway production in 1956 Nancy Walker and Margaret Phillips played Julia and Jane. A 1967 West End revival starred Joan Greenwood and Constance Cummings. In 2000 Felicity Kendal and Frances de la Tour played the wives in a production at the Apollo Theatre, London.

A television adaption of the play was broadcast by the BBC in 1963, with Ann Morrish and Moira Redmond as Julia and Jane. BBC radio presented a production in April 1973, a month after the author's death. Julia was played by Mary Wimbush and Jane by Isabel Dean. The following year, an Anglia television adaptation starred Susannah York as Julia and Joan Collins as Jane.

Reception
At the time of the original production critical opinion was divided, with the down-market section of the press taking a hostile, moralistic stance, and the critics in the more serious newspapers taking a generally favourable view. The Daily Express called the piece an "unpleasant play which might the tickle the palate of certain playgoers who enjoy the decadent." The Daily Mirror found the leading characters and their "'modern' impudences" "very tiresome". The Manchester Guardian praised Coward's theatrical skill as "little short of amazing". and the reviewer in The Observer, though rating the piece "neither a great nor a good play" on account of its overt theatricality and lack of depth, declared himself "vastly amuse[d]" by it. The Times judged that the play confirmed Coward's position as "the most uncannily adroit of our younger dramatists". In The Saturday Review Ivor Brown wrote:

At the time of the Paris production in 1945 the reviewer in the newspaper Ce Soir praised Coward's comedy as comparable with Molière's Le Médecin volant, but some later productions attracted less favourable notices for the play. The West End revivals in 1949 and 1967 prompted comments that the material was too thin for a three-act piece. By the time of the 2000 West End revival, critical opinion had shifted in Coward's favour; Variety found the play "deliciously featherweight", and The Observer called it "a fine piece of Coward writing: witty, trenchant, superficially frothy but actually questioning the empty lives led by these indolent privileged people".

In a 2000 study of Coward's works, Peter Raby groups Fallen Angels with some of the playwright's other early works as showing how Coward was more open than his predecessors Wilde and Saki about the prominence of sex in theatrical romances: "[W]hether the treatment is serious – as in The Vortex and Easy Virtue – or comic – as in Hay Fever and Fallen Angels – the overall impact seems much the same: sex is disruptive, compelling, even overwhelming, while sex and marriage are difficult, perhaps impossible, to reconcile."

Notes, references and sources

Notes

References

Sources
 
 
  
 
 

Plays by Noël Coward
1925 plays